The 1846 Illinois gubernatorial election was the eighth quadrennial election for this office.  Democrat Augustus C. French defeated Whig nominee Thomas M. Kilpatrick, for the office. Richard Eels of the Liberty Party came in a distant third.
The term was cut short, and lasted only half the normal length. This synchronized the gubernatorial election with the election for President.

Results

References
Illinois Blue Book 1899

Illinois
1846
Gubernatorial
August 1846 events